Dolné Plachtince is a village and municipality in the Veľký Krtíš District of the Banská Bystrica Region of southern Slovakia.

History
In historical records, the village was first mentioned in 1337 (Palahta Inferior). It belonged to nobles Dacsoy, Lukay and Simonfy. In 1776 it passed to ecclesiastical Rožňava’s Capitol.

Genealogical resources

The records for genealogical research are available at the state archive "Statny Archiv in Banska Bystrica, Slovakia"

 Roman Catholic church records (births/marriages/deaths): 1689-1900 (parish A)
 Lutheran church records (births/marriages/deaths): 1712-1936 (parish B)

See also
 List of municipalities and towns in Slovakia

External links
 
 
https://web.archive.org/web/20080111223415/http://www.statistics.sk/mosmis/eng/run.html
http://www.e-obce.sk/obec/dolneplachtince/dolne-plachtince.html
Surnames of living people in Dolne Plachtince

Villages and municipalities in Veľký Krtíš District